Springwood Manor is a historic home located at Loudonville in Albany County, New York.  It was originally built about 1890 and is a -story, five-bay, masonry dwelling with a mansard roof.  It was extensively remodeled in 1912 in the Colonial Revival style.  Also on the property are a barn, carriage house, shed, and gardens with a spring fed pond (all non-contributing).

It was listed on the National Register of Historic Places in 1979.

References

Houses on the National Register of Historic Places in New York (state)
Colonial Revival architecture in New York (state)
Houses completed in 1890
Houses in Albany County, New York
National Register of Historic Places in Albany County, New York
Loudonville, New York